Gulariya is a municipality and headquarters of Bardiya District in Lumbini Province of south-western Nepal. It is located in the plains of the Terai region near the southern border with the Bahraich district, Uttar Pradesh state of India. It is 35 kilometers west of Nepalgunj and about 10 km north of Murtiha Transit or railway station, India.

It lies at an elevation of 187 meters.

Overview
Murtiha road or Bhansar road is the main and oldest business hub having book-shops, cosmetic-shops, hardware dealers and home appliances distributors among others. This area is also famous for the various fancy shops alongside of the road. Apart from this area, Radha-krishna chok is another Business area holding banks as well as various hotels. There is also better education facility in the city which are in full operation. Several Private-Boarding as well as Governmental Schools are established in the city like Sunrise Secondary Boarding School, Bageshwory Secondary Boarding School, Janjyoti Higher-Secondary Boarding School, Little-Heaven English Academy, Baglamukhi School among others.
For higher studies, Babai Campus affiliated to Tribhuvan University is also located here.

Demographics
At the time of the 2011 Nepal census, Gulariya Municipality had a population of 68,164. Of these, 38.8% spoke Awadhi, 23.0% Nepali, 22.0% Tharu, 11.5% Urdu, 1.7% Bhojpuri, 1.4% Maithili, 0.4% Newar, 0.4% Magar, 0.3% Doteli and 0.5% other languages as their first language.

In terms of ethnicity/caste, 24.5% were Tharu, 11.2% Musalman, 9.1% Yadav, 8.1% Hill Brahmin, 7.0% Mallaha, 6.1% Chhetri, 5.5% Lodh, 4.2% Chamar/Harijan/Ram, 3.9% Kami and 20.4% others.

In terms of religion, 87.2% were Hindu, 11.0% Muslim, 1.3% Christian, 0.4% Buddhist and 0.1% others.

Nepali is spoken natively by Paharis as well as by people of other ethnicity as the national language and lingua franca. The mother tongue for the older residents is still Awadhi and Tharu language, which is understood and normally spoken by the entire population of the district. Tharu people are considered as the original inhabitants of this area.

Lifestyle

Temperature highly affects the lifestyle of Gulariya. Due to extreme heat in summer season, people wear light cotton clothes and rarely come out during the day time. While in the winter season, the temperature may drop to 6 °C during which people wear thick woollen clothes.

Restaurants in Gulariya are famous for its samosas, chaat, golgappas(Panipuri), dahibada, momos (Nepalese-style Dumplings), sekuwa (roasted spiced-meat), biryani and chilled beer. Samosas, chaat, golgappas(panipuri) and sekuwa from Gulariya are considered to be the most delicious in all of Nepal. Sweet-shops especially the Indian Sweets which involves the best of sweets like the Gulab jamun, Barfi, Ras malai, Jalebi, etc. add even more delicacy to the food loving people of Gulariya.

Culture and Religion
Gulariya city has a diverse culture with people from different faiths living within mixed communities.  Hinduism and Islam are two major religions in the city with Hindus comprising larger percentage of the population. Other religions like Buddhism and the Christianity are among in the minorities. People of different ethnicity are known to have traditionally lived together, without any significant conflicts.

Transport

Gulariya has fully operational bus and mini-bus services that reach almost all parts of the western region that connected by roadways, as well as most parts of the eastern region, including all the major hubs in the country. The main hub for buses is Gulariya Buspark, while small transits are located in several other places in the city like Bhansar chok, Police-station road. Short routes are generally covered by micro-buses and mini-buses, while luxury coaches are available for long routes to destinations like Kathmandu, Pokhara, etc. The country's longest highway- Mahendra Highway, is linked from the city center.

A line of Indian Railways reaches Murtiha across the border.  It involves train changes at Gonda, Bahraich and Nanpara. For travellers coming in from India it is also possible to take an express train to Lucknow and from there a direct bus to Murtiha.  Indian and Nepalese nationals may cross the border without restrictions, however there is a customs checkpoint for goods and third country nationals.

The most common public transport for commuters within the city have long been cycle rickshaws and electric rickshaws. Most common private transport are motorcycles, especially among young adults while bicycles are used by many. Recently the number of automobiles has increased significantly in the city.

Infrastructure

 Bardiya District Hospital
 Gulariya Police Station
 Gulariya Town-hall
 Gulariya District Court
 FNCCI Gulariya Branch

Climate

Gulariya has a sub-tropical climate. Temperatures sometimes exceed 38 °C (102 °F) from April to June.  During the rainy season—arriving in June and lasting into September—it is less hot but sometimes very humid. Winter is usually pleasant while the sun is out.  It sometimes is foggy and overcast; then it can be chilly with temperatures below 10 °C (41 °F) but no frost.

Hotels

With the boost in the tourism industry after the change over in political scenario of Nepal in 1950, hotel industry in Gulariya picked up a significant growth. Now, Gulariya boasts of several good hotels such as Mirror, Sunflower, Shankar,

etc. There are a number of good restaurants in the city that offer traditional Nepalese, as well as, a variety of Indian, Chinese and Western cuisines.

Places of interest

Baglamukhi Temple in Gulariya is one of the most important temples for Hindus. It is dedicated to goddess Baglamukhi.
 Kotahi temple and Thakurdwara temple are equally important worship places and is very famous in this region.
 Bed Byash Batika Temple located in Shantitole-8 is one of the popular places to worship lord Krishna and Radha.
 Bardiya National Park is the most famous tourist destination in this region having a total area of 968 km2 where people can enjoy Jungle Safari riding on an Elephant's back.
 Karnali River is 60 minutes drive west.

Sports

Cricket and football are the two most popular sports in Gulariya.

References

Manjesh rana

Populated places in Bardiya District
Transit and customs posts along the India–Nepal border
Points for exit and entry of nationals from third countries along the India–Nepal border
Tourism in Nepal
Nepal municipalities established in 1997
Municipalities in Bardiya District